Ijeoma Akunyili (also known as Ije Akunyili) is a Nigerian American medical practitioner.

Education 
She graduated Summa Cum Laude from the University of Pennsylvania with a degree in literature. She had a Masters of Public Administration from Harvard then went on to work as a Junior Professional Associate for the World Bank. She attended the University of Maryland School of Medicine. She had her emergency medicine residency at the McGovern Medical School at UTHealth Houston.

Career 
Ijeoma was the regional medical director for TeamHealth's Northeast Group where she managed the operations of nearly 20 emergency departments, critical care, and hospitalist service lines in New Jersey, Connecticut, Rhode Island, Pennsylvania and New York. She had also served as the chair of emergency medicine at Waterbury Hospital. She is the current President of the Connecticut College of Emergency Physicians.

On January 11, 2023, Jersey City Medical Center announced the appointment of Ijeoma as their Chief Medical Officer becoming the hospital's first Black Chief Medical Officer.

Awards 

 2016 - Rising Star Award, American Association of Women Emergency Physicians
 2019 - Medical Director of the Year Award, for work at Waterbury Hospital Emergency Department.

Personal life 
She is married to Aris Brou with two kids. Ije is the first daughter of Dr. Chike Akunyili and Dora Akunyili, former director-general of the National Agency for Food and Drug Administration and Control.

References 

University of Pennsylvania alumni
Harvard Kennedy School alumni
University of Maryland School of Medicine alumni

Living people
Year of birth missing (living people)